RAD51 homolog C (S. cerevisiae), also known as RAD51C, is a protein which in humans is encoded by the RAD51C gene.

Function 

The RAD51C protein is one of five paralogs of RAD51, including RAD51B (RAD51L1), RAD51C (RAD51L2), RAD51D (RAD51L3), XRCC2 and XRCC3.  They each share about 25% amino acid sequence identity with RAD51 and each other.

The RAD51 paralogs are all required for efficient DNA double-strand break repair by homologous recombination and depletion of any paralog results in significant decreases in homologous recombination frequency.

RAD51C forms two distinct complexes with other related paralogs: BCDX2 (RAD51B-RAD51C-RAD51D-XRCC2) and CX3 (RAD51C-XRCC3). These two complexes act at two different stages of homologous recombinational DNA repair.  The BCDX2 complex is responsible for RAD51 recruitment or stabilization at damage sites.  The BCDX2 complex appears to act by facilitating the assembly or stability of the RAD51 nucleoprotein filament.

The CX3 complex acts downstream of RAD51 recruitment to damage sites.  The CX3 complex was shown to associate with Holliday junction resolvase activity, probably in a role of stabilizing gene conversion tracts.

The RAD51C gene is one of genes four localized to a region of chromosome 17q23 where amplification occurs frequently in breast tumors. Overexpression of the four genes during amplification has been observed and suggests a possible role in tumor progression. Alternative splicing has been observed for this gene and two variants encoding different isoforms have been identified.

Clinical significance 

A characteristic of many cancer cells is that parts of some genes contained within these cells have been recombined with other genes.  One such gene fusion that has been identified in a MCF-7 breast cancer cell line is a chimera between the RAD51C and ATXN7 genes. Since the RAD51C protein is involved in repairing double strand chromosome breaks, this chromosomal rearrangement could be responsible for the other rearrangements.

Mutation, splicing, and epigenetic deficiency in cancer

RAD51C mutation increases the risk for breast and ovarian cancer, and was first established as a human cancer susceptibility gene in 2010.  Carriers of an RAD51C mutation had a 5.2-fold increased risk of ovarian cancer, indicating that RAD51C is a moderate ovarian cancer susceptibility gene.  A pathogenic mutation of RAD51C was present in approximately 1% to 3% of unselected ovarian cancers, and among mutation carriers, the lifetime risk of ovarian cancer was approximately 10-15%.

In addition, there are three other causes of RAD51C deficiency that also appear to increase cancer risk.  These are alternative splicing, promoter methylation and repression by over-expression of EZH2.

Three alternatively spliced RAD51C transcripts were identified in colorectal cancers.  Variant 1 is joined from the 3' end of exon-6 to the 5' end of exon-8, variant 2 is joined at the 3' end of exon-5 to the 5' end of exon-8, and variant 3 is joined from the 3' end of exon-6 to the 5' end of exon-9.  Presence and mRNA expression of variant 1 RAD51C was found in 47% of colorectal cancers.  Variant 1 mRNA was expressed about 5-fold more frequently in colorectal tumors than in non-tumor tissues, and when present, was expressed 8-fold more frequently than wild-type RAD51C mRNA.   The authors concluded that variant 1 mRNA was associated with the malignant phenotype of colorectal cancers

In the case of gastric cancer, reduced expression of RAD51C was found in about 40% to 50% of tumors, and almost all tumors with reduced RAD51C expression had methylation of the RAD51C promoter.  On the other hand, methylation of the RAD51C promoter was only found in about 1.5% of ovarian cancer cases.

EZH2 protein is up-regulated in numerous cancers. EZH2 mRNA is up-regulated, on average, 7.5-fold in breast cancer, and between 40% to 75% of breast cancers have over-expressed EZH2 protein.  EZH2 is the catalytic subunit of Polycomb Repressor Complex 2 (PRC2) which catalyzes methylation of histone H3 at lysine 27 (H3K27me) and mediates epigenetic gene silencing of target genes via local chromatin reorganization. EZH2 targets RAD51C, reducing RAD51C mRNA and protein expression (and also represses other RAD51 paralogs RAD51B, RAD51D, XRCC2 and XRCC3).  Increased expression of EZH2, leading to repression of RAD51 paralogs and consequent reduced homologous recombinational repair, was proposed as a cause of breast cancer.

Interactions 

RAD51C has been shown to interact with:
 RAD51L1,
 RAD51L3, and 
 XRCC2,  and
 XRCC3.

References

Further reading